Ethminolia is a genus of sea snails, marine gastropod mollusks in the subfamily Umboniinae of the family Trochidae, the top snails.

Distribution
This marine genus occurs in the Red Sea, Gulf of Oman, the Arabian Sea and off Australia (New South Wales, South Australia, Victoria, Western Australia) and Tasmania.

Species
Species within the genus Ethminolia include:
 Ethminolia akuana Raines, 2007
 Ethminolia degregorii (Caramagna, 1888)
 Ethminolia doriae (Caramagna, 1888)
 Ethminolia durbanensis (Kilburn, 1977)
 Ethminolia elveri Cotton & Godfrey, 1938
 Ethminolia eudeli (Deshayes, 1863)
 Ethminolia glaphyrella (Melvill & Standen, 1895)
 Ethminolia gravieri (Lamy, 1909)
 Ethminolia hemprichii Issel, 1869
 Ethminolia hornungi (Bisacchi, 1931)
 Ethminolia impressa (G. Nevill & H. Nevill, 1869)
 Ethminolia iridifulgens (Melvill, 1910)
 Ethminolia nektonica (Okutani, 1961)
 Ethminolia ornatissima (Schepman, 1908)
 Ethminolia probabilis Iredale, 1924
 Ethminolia sculpta (G.B. Sowerby, 1897)
 Ethminolia stearnsii (Pilsbry, 1895): synonym of Sericominolia stearnsii (Pilsbry, 1895)
 Ethminolia vitiliginea (Menke, 1843)
 † Ethminolia wareni Helwerda, Wesselingh & S. T. Williams, 2014 
Species brought into synonymy 
 Ethminolia bysma Herbert, 1992: synonym of Ethalia bysma Herbert, 1992
 Ethminolia cincta Cotton & Godfrey, 1938: synonym of Spectamen cinctum (Cotton & Godfrey, 1938) (original combination)
 Ethminolia mayi Kershaw, 1955: synonym of Ethminolia probabilis Iredale, 1924
 Ethminolia tasmanica Macpherson, J.H. & Gabriel, C.J. 1962: synonym of Ethminolia vitiliginea (Menke, 1843)

References

 Cotton, B.C., 1959. South Australian Mollusca. Archaeogastropoda. Govt. Printer, Adelaide
 Iredale, T. & McMichael, D.F., 1962 [31/Dec/1962]. A reference list of the marine Mollusca of New South Wales. Mem. Aust. Mus., 11:0-0.
 Wilson, B., 1993. Australian Marine Shells. Prosobranch Gastropods. Odyssey Publishing, Kallaroo, WA
 Higo, S., Callomon, P. & Goto, Y. (1999) Catalogue and Bibliography of the Marine Shell-Bearing Mollusca of Japan Elle Scientific Publications, Yao, Japan, 749 pp.

External links
 Iredale, T. (1924). Results from Roy Bell's molluscan collections. Proceedings of the Linnean Society of New South Wales. 49: 179-278

 
Trochidae
Gastropod genera